Dong Maha Wan is a village and tambon (sub-district) of Wiang Chiang Rung District, in Chiang Rai Province, Thailand. In 2005 it had a population of 6,435 people. The tambon contains 12 villages.

References

Tambon of Chiang Rai province
Populated places in Chiang Rai province